Polynema is a genus of fairyflies or fairy wasps, insects in the family Mymaridae.

Species 

Polynema includes over 200 species of fairyfly.

Species include:

 Polynema euchariforme 
 Polynema howardii 
 Polynema needhami 
 Polynema sagittaria 
 Polynema striaticorne

References 

 Triapitsyn, S.V.; Aquino, D.A. 2010: On the occurrence of Polynema Haliday (Dorypolynema Hayat and Anis) and Palaeoneura Waterhouse (Hymenoptera: Mymaridae) in the New World, with description of two new species. Acta zoológica lilloana, 54(1-2): 61–77.
 Triapitsyn, S.V.; Fidalgo, P. 2006: Definition of Doriclytus, stat. rev. as a subgenus of Polynema and redescription of its type species, P. (Doriclytus) vitripenne (Hymenoptera: Mymaridae). Zootaxa, 1362: 55-68

External links 

 

Hymenoptera genera
Mymaridae